László Tamás (born 18 January 1988) is a Romanian football player of Hungarian descent who plays for Szentlőrinc.

Club career
On 16 July 2017 he was signed by Nemzeti Bajnokság I club Balmazújvárosi FC.

Club statistics

Updated to games played as of 11 May 2019.

References

External links
Balmazújváros Official Website
HLSZ

László Tamás at ÖFB

1988 births
Living people
People from Gheorgheni
Hungarian footballers
Hungarian expatriate footballers
Romanian sportspeople of Hungarian descent
Association football defenders
Pécsi MFC players
Szentlőrinci SE footballers
Vasas SC players
BFC Siófok players
Balmazújvárosi FC players
Szombathelyi Haladás footballers
Szolnoki MÁV FC footballers
Nemzeti Bajnokság I players
Nemzeti Bajnokság II players
Hungarian expatriate sportspeople in Austria
Expatriate footballers in Austria